Lloyd A. Levin (born 1958) is an American film producer.

Biography

Early life
Levin is a native of Paramus, New Jersey, where he attended Paramus High School and graduated in 1976.

Producing career
He was once the president of Lawrence Gordon Productions, and at one time, Largo Entertainment. In 1994, he was promoted to president at the studio.

He won the Online Film Critics Society Award for Best Picture for his work on United 93. He was also nominated for a BAFTA for the same film. He received a nomination for a Golden Satellite Award for the film Boogie Nights. Levin will produce the film adaption of Warren Fahy's bestselling novel Fragment.

Filmography
He was a producer in all films unless otherwise noted.

Film

Miscellaneous crew

Thanks

Television

References

External links

Film producers from New Jersey
Living people
People from Paramus, New Jersey
Paramus High School alumni
1958 births